Arkhipov, or Arkhipova (feminine; Архипова) is a Russian surname that is derived from the male given name Arkhip and literally means Arkhip's.

Arkhipov
 Abram Arkhipov (1862–1930), Russian realist painter
 Aleksey Arkhipov (born 1983), Russian football midfielder
 Anton Arkhipov (footballer, born 1985), Russian football striker
 Artyom Arkhipov (born 1996), Russian football player
 Denis Arkhipov (born 1979), Russian ice hockey centre
 Dmitry Arkhipov (born 1993) is a Russian ice hockey player
 Evgeny Arkhipov (born 1992), Russian curler
 Igor Arkhipov (born 1953), Russian politician
 Ivan Arkhipov (1907–1998), Soviet politician
 Vasily Arkhipov (1926–1998), Soviet naval officer in the Cuban missile crisis
 Vasily Arkhipov (general) (1906–1985), Soviet tank brigade commander and twice Hero of the Soviet Union
 Vladimir Arkhipov (1933-2004) Soviet army general

Arkhipova
 Anna Arkhipova (born 1973), Russian basketball player
 Lyudmila Arkhipova (born 1978), Russian race walker
 Maria Arkhipova (born 1983), Russian metal musician
 Nina Arkhipova (1921–2016), Soviet and Russian film and stage actress
 Irina Arkhipova (1925–2010), Soviet opera singer & People's Artist of the USSR
 Tatyana Petrova Arkhipova (born 1983), Russian runner

See also
4424 Arkhipova, asteroid

References
 

Russian-language surnames